Kolnica may refer to the following places:
Kolnica, Gmina Brudzew in Greater Poland Voivodeship (west-central Poland)
Kolnica, Gmina Malanów in Greater Poland Voivodeship (west-central Poland)
Kolnica, Podlaskie Voivodeship (north-east Poland)
Kolnica, Opole Voivodeship (south-west Poland)